The Stewart Headwind JD1HW1.7 and SAC-1VW is a single-seat high-wing tube-and-fabric construction homebuilt aircraft.

Design and development
The first Headwind was flown on March 28, 1962. It was one of the first aircraft to fly in the United States using a VW engine. The prototype flew with a Huggins VW conversion. To use a standard propeller, a patented PRSU (propeller speed reducing unit) was developed to keep the engine RPM high and propeller RPM at its optimum speed.

The design was inspired by the Demoiselle by Alberto Santos-Dumont. The fuselage is triangular sections of welded tube steel covered in fabric.

Variants
A Volkswagen air-cooled engine was the only engine specified for this model, however many examples exist with alternate engine installations.

Specifications Stewart Headwind

See also

References

Sport Aviation Feb 1972, pp 22. Stewart Headwind
Sport Aviation June 1976, pp 70. On To Oshkosh! Headwind Caravan

External links
https://sites.google.com/site/flywithstewart/
http://www.airbum.com/pireps/PirepPeanutHeadwind.html
http://www.pilotfriend.com/experimental/acft3/66.htm

Homebuilt aircraft